Engledow is a surname. Notable people with the surname include:

Charles John Engledow (1860–1932), British military officer and politician
Dave Engledow, American photographer
Frank Engledow (1890–1985), British botanist
Lou Engledow, Australian public servant